Leiobunum rotundum is a species of harvestman that is found within the western portion of the Old World.

Description
Leiobunum rotundum is chestnut-brown, with a small, smooth, and very long round or oval body and thin black legs, as well as having no separation between the head and the abdomen. The harvestman's legs can be self-amputated if it is in danger of predation, but they do not regenerate. Although the harvestman has no fangs, poison glands, or silk glands, it can protect itself with the scent glands on the front of its body. The scent glands produce a secretion that repels predators. The species has three different types of nephrocytes. Numerous large nephrocytes occur in clusters between the muscles in the anterior region of the body. Smaller nephrocytes are scattered throughout the body, often stuck to tracheoles. The third type of nephrocyte is attached to the heart wall by connective ligaments. The morphology of the tracheae in this species is very similar to that of Nemastoma lugubre.

Habitat
This harvestman is widespread throughout Britain, including the Channel Islands. It can also be found on the Canary Islands and in Africa. The species can be found among vegetation such as long grass, herbaceous plants, shrubs, and trees.

Diet
The harvestman eats a wide range of small invertebrates, alive or dead. Small invertebrates that it eats include caterpillars, mites, woodlice, and slugs. It drinks a lot of water, especially dew. It will sometimes suck the juice out of overripe or bruised fruit such as windfall apples. The harvestman sometimes goes to outside lights to eat insects that are attracted to the light.

References

Harvestmen
Animals described in 1798
Arachnids of Africa
Arachnids of Europe
Articles containing video clips
Taxa named by Pierre André Latreille